Marc Antoine Baudot (18 March 1765 – 23 March 1837) was a French memoirist and physician.

1765 births
1837 deaths
Members of the Legislative Assembly (France)
French memoirists
19th-century French physicians
Regicides of Louis XVI
Représentants en mission
19th-century memoirists